Carnival in Flanders may refer to:

 Carnival in Flanders (film)
 Carnival in Flanders (musical)